Shimla-Rokonpur Union is a union parishad of Kaliganj Upazila, in Jhenaidah District, Khulna Division of Bangladesh. There are 10 villages and 9 mouzas in the union.

References

External links
 

Unions of Khulna Division
Unions of Kaliganj Upazila, Jhenaidah
Unions of Jhenaidah District